Sir Thomas Gresley, 10th Baronet (17 January 1832 – 18 December 1868) was an English Conservative Party politician who was elected to the constituency of South Derbyshire, but died before he took his seat.

Gresley was born at Netherseal, (then in) Leicestershire, the son of William Gresley (9th Baronet) and his wife Georgina Anne Reid. William was a clergyman who inherited the baronetcy on the death of a kinsman Roger Gresley. Thomas Gresley succeeded his father who died on 3 September 1847.

Gresley was elected as a member of parliament for South Derbyshire at the general election in November 1868. However he never took his seat and died the same year at the age of 36 at Shipley Hall. He was buried at Caldwell where hs is commemorated by a brass.

Gresley married Laura Ann Williams on 28 February 1854. They had a son Robert, who succeeded to the baronetcy.

References

 Debrett's Baronetage of England  7th Edition (1839) pp 34/5 (Google Books)

External links 

1832 births
1868 deaths
Baronets in the Baronetage of England
Conservative Party (UK) MPs for English constituencies
UK MPs 1868–1874
People from Leicestershire (before 1897)
Members of the Parliament of the United Kingdom for constituencies in Derbyshire